Robert Kwame Mensah (born 2 November 1935) is a Ghanaian politician and teacher. He served as member of the first parliament of the second republic of Ghana for Nkwanta constituency in the Volta Region of Ghana.

Early life and education 
Robert Kwame Mensah, an indigene of the Volta Region of Ghana was born on 2 November 1935. He attended Roman Catholic and Local Authority Schools, Kete-Krachi and Teteman-Buem and obtained respectively a Teachers' Training Certificate, G.C.E (General Certificate of Education) "O" and "A" levels.

Politics 
Robert Kwame Mensah was elected during the 1969 Ghanaian parliamentary election as member of the first parliament of the second republic of Ghana on the ticket of the Progress Party. He was on seat from 1 October 1969 to 13 January 1972.

Personal life 
He is a Catholic.

References 

1935 births
Ghanaian MPs 1969–1972
Ghanaian educators
People from Volta Region
Progress Party (Ghana) politicians
Ghanaian Roman Catholics
Living people
20th-century Ghanaian politicians